The Halal Guys is a halal fast casual restaurant franchise that began as halal carts on the southeast and southwest corners of 53rd Street and Sixth Avenue in Manhattan, New York City. New locations, both food cart and storefront, are being added throughout New York (including a storefront on 14th Street and Second Avenue) and around the world.

The franchise is most recognized by its primary dish which is a platter of chicken or gyro meat with rice, though it also serves a chicken or gyro wrap sandwich.

History
The Halal Guys was founded in 1990 by Egyptian-Americans Mohamed Abouelenein,Ahmed Elsaka and Abdelbaset Elsayed as a hot dog cart located at the southeast corner of 53rd Street and Sixth Avenue. Abouelenein, however, believed that a hot dog was not a satisfying meal, and switched to the current menu of chicken, gyro meat, rice, and pita in 1992. As a result, New York City's Muslim cab drivers flocked to the cart for its ability to provide a quick, relatively inexpensive halal meal. As word of mouth spread via these cab drivers, the operators created the signature dish, a platter of chicken and rice which was popularized within the Muslim community in the city.

The cart has caused a decline in the popularity of hot dog vendors in New York City and has influenced many food trucks.

A cart called "New York's Best Halal Food" is also located on the southwest corner of 53rd Street and Sixth Avenue. It is unknown which cart was located at the intersection first.

On October 28, 2006, a fight that started in line ended with 23-year-old Ziad Tayeh stabbing and killing 19-year-old Tyrone Gibbons. The fight began after one accused the other of cutting in line. Tayeh was later found not guilty, as the jury found that he acted in self-defense. The New York Times once reported that the owners had hired bouncers.

The Halal Guys donated $30,000 to LaGuardia Community College in 2016 with the money intended to fund scholarships for students experiencing financial hardships.

Food
The Halal Guys serves "American halal" platters and sandwiches, prepared using ingredients such as chicken, gyro meat, falafel and rice. The taste has been described as entailing a complex melting pot of flavors originating from the Mediterranean and Middle East. The Halal Guys also serve a white sauce condiment which patrons cite as a favorite and has been described as "famous". A "distant cousin of tzatziki", the Halal Guys' white sauce has been the subject of multiple recreations based on ingredients on to-go packets, but to no avail. A similar condiment is found at all or most other halal carts in New York City, but the recipe likely often varies from cart to cart. The Halal Guys also prepares a red hot sauce.

Franchising

In June of 2014, Halal Guys hired Fransmart, a franchise development company that had previously worked with Qdoba Mexican Grill and Five Guys and had sold 350 franchises as of March 2016.  Within the first year of launching their franchise expansion campaign they closed deals for California; New Jersey; Connecticut; Virginia; Washington, D.C.; Houston and Austin, Texas; Chicago, Illinois, as well as international deals for Canada, the Philippines, Malaysia and Indonesia.

Reception
In 2005, Chicken and Rice was one of four finalists for the "Vendy Award" presented by a New York City street vendor advocacy group known as the Street Vendor Project. Chicken and Rice eventually lost out to Rolf Babiel from Hallo Berlin, a sausage cart on 54th and 5th.

In addition, the popularity of the cart has been further aided by high-profile customers. Chef Christopher Lee, who was one of Food & Wines best new chefs of 2006, mentioned in an interview with the magazine that he "can't stay away from it" and once was there on Christmas Eve waiting two and a half hours in the cold.

The cart has since become a prominent cuisine throughout New York City and has been heard as far as Hawaii. It has caused an increase in competition among street meat carts in Midtown Manhattan. Lines commonly grow to over an hour's wait. There is also a student club at New York University dedicated to the food cart.

The Halal Guys was awarded the 2014 Multicultural Award by the American Muslim Consumer Consortium for their promotion of diversity and multiculturalism, and their inclusivity to all minorities in America.

See also
 List of chicken restaurants
 List of restaurants in New York City

References

External links
 

1990 establishments in New York City
Arab-American culture in New York City
Egyptian-American culture in New York City
Food trucks
Halal restaurants
Midtown Manhattan
Restaurants in Manhattan
Street culture
Fast-food franchises
Street food
Restaurants established in 1990